Charlie Tapscott is an Australian Paralympic amputee swimmer and table tennis player from Wollongong, New South Wales. At the 1980 Arnhem Games, he competed in swimming and table tennis, winning two silver medals in Men's 50 m Backstroke J and  Men's 50 m Freestyle J events.

He was inducted into New South Wales Hall of Champions. In 1981, he went on a hunger strike outside New South Wales Government Insurance Office over a damages award.

References

External links
 

Male Paralympic swimmers of Australia
Paralympic table tennis players of Australia
Swimmers at the 1980 Summer Paralympics
Table tennis players at the 1980 Summer Paralympics
Paralympic silver medalists for Australia
Year of birth missing (living people)
Living people
Medalists at the 1980 Summer Paralympics
Paralympic medalists in swimming
Australian male backstroke swimmers
Australian male freestyle swimmers
20th-century Australian people